Déborah Lukumuena (born 4 December 1994) is a French actress. She is best known for her debut role in the 2016 drama film Divines, for which she won the César Award for Best Supporting Actress.

Career
In 2017, Déborah Lukumuena won the César Award for Best Supporting Actress for her role in a 2016 drama film Divines and became the first black woman and the youngest winner in this category.

Filmography

Theater

References

External links

Best Supporting Actress César Award winners
French film actresses
21st-century French actresses
Living people
1994 births